Parapoynx curviferalis is a moth in the family Crambidae. It was described by Francis Walker in 1866. It is found in North America, where it has been recorded from New Brunswick to Florida and from Illinois to Alabama.

The wingspan is about 17 mm. Adults are nearly identical to Parapoynx badiusalis. Adults have been recorded on wing from June to August.

References

Acentropinae
Moths described in 1866